Ivan Roa Christian (31 May 1919 – 1991) was a politician from Pitcairn. He was the Chief Magistrate of Pitcairn Island from 1976 to 1984. As his surname suggests, he is descended from the original mutineers who settled the island, led by Fletcher Christian. He is related to a number of other island leaders, including his father Richard Edgar Christian, his uncle Charles Richard Parkin Christian and his great-grandfather Thursday October Christian II. Through his marriage to Verna Young, he is the father of Steve Christian and Brenda Christian.

Ancestry

References

1919 births
Pitcairn Islands politicians
1991 deaths
Pitcairn Islands people
Pitcairn Islands people of Saint Kitts and Nevis descent
Pitcairn Islands people of English descent
Pitcairn Islands people of Manx descent
Pitcairn Islands people of Polynesian descent
Pitcairn Islands people of Scottish descent
Pitcairn Islands people of Cornish descent